is a railway station on the West Japan Railway Company (JR West) Sanyō Main Line (JR Kobe Line) in Suma-ku, Kobe, Hyōgo Prefecture, Japan. Only local trains stop at this station.

Layout

Platforms

History 
Sumakaihinkōen station opened on 15 March 2008.

Station numbering was introduced in March 2018 with Sumakaihinkōen being assigned station number JR-A67.

Adjacent stations

References

External links
Sumakaihinkōen Station

JR Kobe Line
Sanyō Main Line
Railway stations in Kobe
Railway stations in Japan opened in 2008